is a private university in Uchinada, Ishikawa, Japan, established in 1972.

A general hospital Kanazawa Medical University Hospital is attached to the university. The university has operated Kanazawa Medical University Himi Municipal Hospital in Himi, Toyama since 2008.

External links
 Official website 
 Official website 

Educational institutions established in 1972
Private universities and colleges in Japan
Universities and colleges in Ishikawa Prefecture
Kanazawa
1972 establishments in Japan
Medical schools in Japan